Cosmopepla is a genus of stink bugs in the family Pentatomidae. Cosmopepla lintneriana  is the type species. Cosmopepla lintneriana was first described in 1798 by Johan Christian Fabricius as Cimex carnifex.

Species
 Cosmopepla bimaculata (Thomas, 1865)
 Cosmopepla binotata Distant, 1889
 Cosmopepla coeruleata Montandon, 1893
 Cosmopepla conspicillaris (Dallas, 1851) – hedgenettle stink bug, conspicuous stink bug
 Cosmopepla cruciaria Stål, 1872
 Cosmopepla decorata (Hahn, 1834)
 Cosmopepla intergressus (Uhler, 1893)
 Cosmopepla lintneriana (Kirkaldy, 1909) – twice-stabbed stink bug
 Cosmopepla uhleri Montandon, 1893

References

Carpocorini
Pentatomomorpha genera